The Romanian Academy in Rome is a research institution under the aegis of the Romanian Academy, founded in 1920 by an initiative of archaeologist Vasile Pârvan and historian Nicolae Iorga. The site of the Romanian Academy in Rome is on the Pincio (Pincian Hill), near the Villa Borghese gardens, in Rome, Italy. The villa housing the Romanian Academy in Rome dates from 1933 and was designed by Petre Antonescu.

See also 
 American Academy in Rome
 British School at Rome
 Deutsche Akademie Rom Villa Massimo
 Romanian Academy
Nicolae Iorga Institute of History
 Vasile Pârvan Institute of Archaeology
 Iași Institute of Archaeology
 Institute of Archaeology and Art History, Cluj-Napoca
 Romanian Cultural Institute

References

External links 
 Romanian Academy in Rome — official website

Foreign academies in Rome
Research institutes in Italy
Institutes of the Romanian Academy
Romanian art
Romanian culture